The Serie del Rey is the annual championship series of the Liga Mexicana de Beisbol to determine a champion at the end of each season since 1970. The champions from each division, Norte and Sur, compete in a best-of-seven series, with the winner being awarded the Copa de Zaachila. Previously, the league champion was the winner of the most games in a round robin tournament. The series is named in reference to baseball being called the king of sports.

The Diablos Rojos del México have played in 33 series and won 16 championships, the most of any teams, followed by the Quintana Roo Tigres who have played in 16 and won 12 and the Sultanes de Monterrey who have played in 15 and won 10.

League champions (1925–69)

League champions (1970–present)

See also
Asia Series
Caribbean Series
Japan Series
Korean Series
Taiwan Series
World Series

References

External links
 Campeones en la Historia de la Liga Mexicana Official Website

Mexican League
Recurring sporting events established in 1970
Minor league baseball playoffs and champions
Minor League Baseball lists